Fulgence Kayishema (born 1960) is a Rwandan Hutu militiaman wanted for war crimes in relation to his role in the 1994 Rwandan genocide. Born in Kivumu, he was the inspector of the judicial police there at the time of the genocide. His indictment cites his involvement in massacres from April 6, 1994, till April 20, along with Athanase Seromba, Grégoire Ndahimana, Télesphore Ndungutse, the judge Joseph Habiyambere and the assistant mayor Vedaste Mupende.

Background
Fulgence Kayishema is charged by the Prosecutor of the International Criminal Tribunal for Rwanda (ICTR) with genocide, conspiracy to commit genocide and extermination (crimes against humanity). The ICTR indictment, dated 5 July 2001, alleges that, among other acts, Fulgence Kayishema ordered the killing of Tutsis inside Nyange church, and brought fuel for use by the Interahamwe militia to attempt to burn down the church. An estimated 2,000 civilians died in this attack alone.

On 22 February 2012, the ICTR Referral Chamber ordered this case to Rwanda. At present Fulgence Kayishema remains at large.

The U.S. government is offering a reward up to 5 million USD for information leading to Kayishema's arrest.

See also
List of fugitives from justice who disappeared

References 

1960 births
Fugitives wanted by Rwanda
Fugitives wanted by the International Criminal Tribunal for Rwanda
Living people
People indicted by the International Criminal Tribunal for Rwanda